The 2014 Asian Wrestling Championships was held at the Daulet Sport Complex in Astana, Kazakhstan. The event took place from April 23 to April 27, 2014.

Medal table

Team ranking

Medal summary

Men's freestyle

Men's Greco-Roman

Women's freestyle

Participating nations 
257 competitors from 17 nations competed.

 (23)
 (10)
 (22)
 (16)
 (9)
 (24)
 (1)
 (24)
 (19)
 (16)
 (10)
 (3)
 (20)
 (15)
 (10)
 (24)
 (11)

References
Official Results Book

External links
FILA Official website

Asia
Asian Wrestling Championships
W
Wrestling Championships
Sport in Astana
Wrestling Championships
Wrestling Championships